The 1993–94 Logan Cup was the first competing of the Logan Cup as a first-class cricket competition. It was held in Zimbabwe from 14 January – 20 March 1994. It was won by Mashonaland Under-24s, who drew with Matabeleland in the final, and won courtesy of having finished top in the league stage of the competition. Wayne James of Matabeleland was named the player of the series for his batting.

Points table

Final

References

1994 in cricket
1994 in Zimbabwean sport
Domestic cricket competitions in 1993–94
Logan Cup